St. Peter's Umbrella is a 1958 Slovak-Hungarian drama film directed by Frigyes Bán and Vladislav Pavlovič and starring Mari Törőcsik, Sándor Pécsi and Karol Machata. It was based on the 1895 novel St. Peter's Umbrella by Kálmán Mikszáth which had previously been adapted into a silent film in 1917 and a sound film in 1935.

Main cast
 Mari Törőcsik - Bélyi Veronika 
 Sándor Pécsi - János Bélyi, plebanian 
 Karol Machata - George Weebra, lawyer
 János Rajz - Paul Gregelich
 István Egri - Sztoralik, typesetter
 Gábor Mádi Szabó - Mravacsán, the mayor
 Márta Fónay - Mravacsán's wife 
 Irén Psota - The "little lady" 
 Nusi Somogyi - Ms. Münz 
 László Márkus - A relative of the mayor 
 Zsuzsa Csala - Ms. Srankó 
 Karol L. Zachar - St. Peter 
 Ági Margitai - Minka

External links

1958 films
Hungarian drama films
Czechoslovak drama films
1950s Hungarian-language films
Hungarian satirical films
Slovak drama films
Films directed by Frigyes Bán
Films based on Hungarian novels
Hungarian multilingual films
1950s multilingual films